Arugam Bay, known locally as "Arugam Kudah", is situated on the Indian Ocean in the dry zone of Sri Lanka's southeast coast, and a historic settlement of the ancient Batticaloa Territory (Mattakallappu Desam). The main settlement in the area, known locally as Ullae, is predominantly Muslim, however there is a significant Sri Lankan Tamil and Sinhala population to the south of the village, as well as a number of international expatriates, largely from Europe and Australia. While traditionally fishing has dominated the local economy, tourism has grown rapidly in the area in recent years. Arugam Kudah's literal Tamil translation is "Bay of Cynodon dactylon". Tourism in Arugam Bay is dominated by surf tourism, thanks to several quality breaks in the area, however tourists are also attracted by the local beaches, lagoons, historic temples and the nearby Kumana National Park.

Conflict between fishing and tourism
During the period of fighting between the central government and Tamil separatists tourism was fairly low key and the hotels often bought the catch of the fishermen. As a result of the peace, tourism expanded and many fishing people who had moved to areas less touched by the conflict returned. Hotel owners began to complain about the smell of drying fish and how the fishing huts blocked their view. In the aftermath of the Tsunami fishing people were forbidden to return, officially on the grounds of safety but allegedly as a result of pressure from the hotel owners.

Surrounding areas
The nearby Muslim village of Pottuvil is the center of commerce and transportation while tourist accommodations lie along the beach to the south of Pottuvil Arugam Bay is also the gateway and the only road access to the Yala East National Park. In  distance there is Pasarichenai Beach. This area is known as Kumana, to be reached via the Tamil/Sinhalese settlement of Panama (Sri Lanka) and the Tamil shires at Okanda. The local area is home to a number of elephants, often travelling between Lahugala and Kumana national parks.

Surfing 

Arugam Bay is the most popular surf spot and is also the only international surf competition venue in Sri Lanka. It is also rated as one of the top ten surf destinations in the world. It has also hosted most of the international surfing competitions in Sri Lanka since 2004. It also hosted the So Sri Lanka Pro 2019.

References

External links

Bodies of water of Ampara District
Seaside resorts in Sri Lanka